Cambridge Rugby Union Football Club or CRUFC ('The Blood & Sand') is a rugby union club representing the city of Cambridge, England. Formed in 1923 the club currently competes in the third tier of the English rugby union system, National League 1, following promotion from National League 2 South in 2016. The club plays its home matches at the 1,250 capacity Grantchester Road ground, in the suburb of Newnham, approximately two kilometres south-west of the city centre. The club runs three senior squads: the national league squad, a development squad, and a social squad. At junior level the club runs one of the oldest mini and youth rugby sections in the country, starting back in the early 1970s, with a colts team for under-18s.

History

Cambridge RUFC was formed in 1923 and was settled in its current ground by the 1950s. In 1993 the club was offered the opportunity to buy the lease on its existing three pitches and to buy adjoining land for a further three pitches from King's College. Floodlights were added to one of these pitches in 2003 so that evening games might be played and the light available for training was improved.

Cambridge RUFC joined the newly formed league structure in 1988 and by 1991 was playing in London 3 North East. After five years in this division, the club was promoted to London 2 North and after four years in this division, was promoted at the end of the 1998–99 season to London 1, which feeds into the National Leagues. In the Club's first season in London 1, they achieved 4th place, plus a run to the semi-final of the NPI Cup, falling just one match from Twickenham, after defeat away at Hull by 21–17. London 1 status was secured again for the 2001–02 Season, but the squad led to relegation at the end of that season. However, by the end of the 2003–04 season, a rebuilt side regained promotion to London 1. Cambridge also won the Eastern Counties Cup for the first time and regained the Cambridgeshire Cup from perennial rivals Shelford. This time, the stay in London 1 was to be even shorter; At the end of an exciting season the League championship lay between Worthing and Cambridge at the start of the final round of matches: Worthing at home to Canterbury and Cambridge at home to Basingstoke. The championship would go to the team achieving the greatest points difference. In the event, Cambridge won by 96–15 and Worthing were condemned to the play-offs. Cambridge went on to beat Norwich in the Eastern Counties Cup Final and Shelford in the Cambridgeshire Cup Final — the second successive treble, and promotion to National League rugby for the first time.

In the 2005–06 season Cambridge once again secured promotion after a two horse race. This time with Norfolk & East Anglian Giants North Walsham who had been present in this league for well over a decade. Cambridge squeezed past them with a last day win at Reading while North Walsham failed by 21–20 at Southend. This was all the more lucky as North Walsham had secured the bonus point for four tries but failed with all four conversions. In the 2006–07 season Cambridge managed to consolidate their position in National Division Two with a 9th-place finish. In the 2008–09 season Cambridge finished second in the league and would have been promoted had it not been for the re-organisation of the leagues in mid season.

Current season

League history

Overall

Players
A number of players have gone on to gain International rugby honours, including Dickie Jeeps (England and British Lions), Andy Hancock (England), Bob Steven (Scotland), Trefor Evans (Wales), Simon Culhane New Zealand, including appearances in the 1995 World Cup Finals, and Alex Goode (England). Many more have earned age grade or England Counties caps. In 2014 Martin Wolfenden represented Zimbabwe in the qualifying competition for the Rugby World Cup.

The club's most capped player is the late Shaun Gadsby who made 505 appearances for the club, his last being in the 2003/04 season aged 40.

Honours

Senior team
 London 3 North East: champions: 1991–92
 London Division Two North: 1998–99
 Eastern Counties Cup (3): 2003–04, 2004–05, 2005–06
 Cambridgeshire Cup (3): 2003–04, 2004–05, 2005–06
 London 2 (north v south) promotion play-off winner: 2003–04
 London Division One: 2004–05
 National League 2 South (2): 2005–06, 2015–16

Youth teams
 Eastern Counties U-17s Cup (3): 1992, 2002, 2006
 Eastern Counties U-19s Cup (3): 1994, 2003, 2004
 National U-19 Plate (1): 2002

External links
 Official website

English rugby union teams
Rugby clubs established in 1923
Rugby union in Cambridgeshire
Sport in Cambridge
Grantchester